Nazariy Petrovych Bohomaz (born 12 January 2000) is a Ukrainian professional footballer who plays as a centre-forward for Polish club Cosmos Nowotaniec.

References

External links
 Profile on Volyn Lutsk official website
 

2000 births
Living people
People from Volyn Oblast
Ukrainian footballers
Association football forwards
FC Volyn Lutsk players
SC Dnipro-1 players
FC Hirnyk-Sport Horishni Plavni players
Ukrainian First League players
Ukrainian Second League players
IV liga players
Ukrainian expatriate footballers
Expatriate footballers in Poland
Ukrainian expatriate sportspeople in Poland